Sir Isidor George Henschel (18 February 185010 September 1934) was a German-born British baritone, pianist, conductor, composer and academic teacher. First trained as a pianist, He was a concert singer who sometimes sang to his own accompaniment. He was a close friend of Johannes Brahms. His first wife Lillian was also a singer. He was the first conductor of both the Boston Symphony Orchestra and the Royal Scottish National Orchestra. He taught at the Institute of Musical Art in New York City.

Biography 
Georg Isidor Henschel was born at Breslau (now Wrocław, Poland), and educated as a pianist, making his first public appearance in Berlin in 1862. He subsequently took up singing, initially and briefly as a basso profundo but developing a fine baritone voice. In 1868, he sang the role of Hans Sachs in a concert performance of Wagner's Die Meistersinger von Nürnberg at Munich. With one minor and unplanned exception, he never sang on stage, confining himself to concert appearances.

Henschel was a close friend of Johannes Brahms, whom he met in May 1874 at the Lower Rhenish Music Festival in Cologne, where Henschel sang the role of Harapha in Handel's oratorio Samson. The friendship lasted until Brahms's death on 3 April 1897; Henschel reports in his memoirs that he arrived in Vienna only hours too late to see Brahms before his passing, and that their last meeting had been at a restaurant in Leipzig in 1896, where they were joined by Edvard Grieg and Arthur Nikisch.

In 1877, Henschel began a successful career in England, singing at the principal concerts. In 1881, he married the American soprano, Lilian June Bailey (1860–1901), who was associated with him in a number of vocal recitals throughout the United States and nearly all Europe until 1884. Henschel's very highly developed sense of interpretation and style made him an ideal concert singer, while he was no less distinguished as accompanist. In fact he sometimes combined both functions; he made records as late as 1928 for the Columbia Graphophone Company, singing Lieder by Schubert and Schumann to his own accompaniment.

Henschel was also a prominent conductor, in America and England. He became the first conductor of the Boston Symphony Orchestra in 1881, using the name Georg Henschel. On his appointment, he sent his ideas for an innovative seating chart to Brahms, who replied and commented in an approving letter of mid-November 1881. In 1886, he started a series known as the London Symphony Concerts, and in 1893 became the first conductor of the Royal Scottish National Orchestra.

His compositions include instrumental works, a Stabat Mater (Birmingham Festival, 1894), an opera, Nubia (Dresden, 1899), and a Requiem (Boston, 1903). In 1907 he published a collection of his journals and correspondence in Personal Recollections of Johannes Brahms and in 1918 Musings and Memories of a Musician. A Mass in eight parts a cappella was first sung in 1916.

He was knighted in 1914 and at a farewell concert that year, was presented with a lute engraved with "A token of gratitude for forty years' song". He taught at the Institute of Musical Art in New York, where he met his second wife, Amy Louis, one of his students. He also taught soprano Lucia Dunham., and while in England, Mary Augusta Wakefield.

Personal life
Henschel's daughter, Georgina "Georgie" Henschel, was a noted breeder of Highland ponies and Norwegian Fjord ponies, and author of several equestrian books. 

Henschel died in Aviemore, Scotland, where he maintained his holiday-home Alltnacriche with his wife. He is buried in the churchyard overlooking Loch Alvie, nearby. In 1944 his daughter Helen Henschel, herself a singer, published a biography of her parents entitled When Soft Voices Die: A Musical Biography.

References

Sources
 Dictionary of National Biography

External links
 Jewish Encyclopedia: "Henschel, Georg (Isidor)" by Isidore Singer & A. Porter (1906).
 
 
  George Henschel and Lilian June Bailey(1860–1901), taken in the 1880s

1850 births
1934 deaths
British conductors (music)
British male conductors (music)
British classical pianists
German conductors (music)
German male conductors (music)
19th-century German Jews
Musicians from Wrocław
Jewish classical musicians
Naturalised citizens of the United Kingdom
German emigrants to England
Juilliard School faculty
Knights Bachelor
Composers awarded knighthoods
Musicians awarded knighthoods
Conductors (music) awarded knighthoods
People from the Province of Silesia
German classical pianists
Male classical pianists
British people of German-Jewish descent
 burials in Scotland